A sponge city is a new urban construction model for flood management, strengthening ecological infrastructure and drainage systems, proposed by Chinese researchers in early 2000 and accepted by the Chinese Communist Party (CCP) and the State Council as urbanism policy in 2014. It can alleviate urban flooding, water resources shortage, and the urban heat island effect and improve the ecological environment and biodiversity by absorbing and capturing rain water and utilizing it to reduce floods. Rain water harvested can be repurposed for irrigation and for home use. It is a form of a sustainable drainage system on an urban scale and beyond. Sponge city policies are a set of nature based solutions that use natural landscapes to catch, store and clean water; the concept has been inspired by ancient wisdom of  adaptation to climate challenges, particularly in the monsoon world.

“Sponge cities are part of a worldwide movement that goes by various names: green infrastructure in Europe, low-impact development in the United States, water-sensitive urban design in Australia, natural infrastructure in Peru, nature-based solutions in Canada. In contrast to industrial management, in which people confine water with levees, channels, and asphalt and rush it off the land as quickly as possible, these newer approaches seek to restore water’s natural tendency to linger in places like wetlands and floodplains.”

History
The People's Republic of China adopted the Sponge City initiative, largely motivated by the failure of the conventional grey infrastructure of flood control and stormwater management systems, due to the persistent efforts by Chinese ecological urbanists through letters and proposals sent to high level Chinese authorities since early 2000. Though the concept had been published and practiced since early 2000, it was the Beijing flood on July 21, 2012 which caused 79 deaths that prompted the top Chinese authorities to accept the Sponge City concept and make it a nationwide policy. In 2015, China was reported to have initiated a pilot initiative in 16 districts. This initiative presents an alternative to solve Asia's flood problems. China seeks to curb its flood with the initiative. The country plans for 80 percent of its urban cities to harvest and reuse 70 percent of rainwater. Building sponge cities does not necessary require huge investments. But such a fact has been widely misunderstood due to misleading media and the fact that the "sponge city" has been more than often misused by local government and contractors, as well as unprofessional designers as a fashionable brand and slogan which has actually nothing to do with this nature based solution. The major obstacles of implementing the nature-based sponge city are the business-as-usual mentality of grey infrastructure engineering, ornamental gardening and conventional urban planning, as well as the code systems that have been established to defend these obsolete urbanism practices. However, funding sponge cities has also been a challenge. 

After achieving success in China, the sponge city model has attracted over-exposed climate zones such as Dhaka and Kenya, as well as major cities like Berlin and Los Angeles.

Background 

Urbanization encourages the construction of city infrastructure. However, excessive utilization and development of water infrastructure can lead to water shortages, pollution, and overall degradation of water ecosystem services. Unscientific architectural planning also creates a large number of buildings, simultaneously limiting cities' green space, drainage, and rainwater collection ability. Consequently, rain discharge cannot meet modern cities' requirements, causing cities lots of problems regarding water ecology and aquatic environments.

Meanwhile, high-intensity artificial constructions, such as buildings, roads, and public squares, lead to the lower pad's excessive hardening, changing the original natural foundation and hydrological characteristics. Because of this, surface flow increases from 10% to 60%, while infiltration is drastically reduced, even to zero. According to an investigation that the Ministry of Housing and Urban‑Rural Development conducted in 2010, 62% of 351 cities across the country faced flooding between 2008 and 2010; 137 cities flooded more than three times during this time period. This frequent urban flooding makes more and more people recognize the importance of water ecosystems and urban ecological infrastructure. The simple concept of fast discharge, a traditional gray water management model, is no longer helpful in addressing the rainwater dilemma during rapid urbanization. To cope with such extensive urban water issues, China is increasingly attaching importance to urban flood management and water ecological-system services and vigorously promoting the idea of Sponge City.

Policy 
In his speech at the Urbanization Work Conference on December 12, 2013, CCP general secretary Xi Jinping said "When upgrading the urban drainage system, priority should be given to retaining limited rainwater and using the power of nature to drain water. Build a sponge city with natural retention, natural penetration, and natural purification." To this end, in October 2014, the Ministry of Housing and Urban-Rural Development issued 'Technical Guidelines for Sponge City Construction,' emphasizing the importance of the top-level design of urban rainwater management, as well as planning to guide urban construction with ecological priority as the basic principle.

In August 2015, the 'Sponge City Construction Performance Evaluation Method' clarified requirements for the use of central fiscal funds and provided guidelines for the construction effectiveness of pilot demonstration cities. According to the guidelines and related standards and specifications, the China Building Standard Design and Research Institute has initially established a 'sponge city construction standard design system,' including newly built, expanded, and rebuilt sponge buildings and communities, roads and squares, parks, green spaces, and urban water systems.

The General Office of the State Council Guideline to promote building sponge cities (Guobanfa [2015] No. 75) pointed out that the construction of sponge cities occurs through strengthening the management of urban planning and construction, giving full play to the impact of buildings, roads, green spaces, and water systems on rainwater. Under the guideline, cities in China will collect and utilize 70 percent of the rainwater, with 20 percent of urban areas meeting the target by 2020, and the proportion will increase to 80 percent by 2030.

In 2015 and 2016, pilot projects for sponge cities were organized with the support of national policies. Sixteen cities, including Zhenjiang, Jiaxing, and Xiamen, were selected as the first batch of pilot cities, and 14 cities, including Shenzhen, Shanghai, Tianjin, and Beijing, were selected as the second batch of pilot cities to carry out the construction of sponge cities in an orderly manner. In addition, the Central Ministry of Finance introduced a public-private partnership (PPP) model to increase financial policy support.

However, this set-up may threaten local government's ability to fund these programs, which are estimated to require $230 billion by 2030 in order to meet their goals. The national government is only planning to subsidize one-fifth of the costs of implementing Sponge City policies, and the flooding of over half of pilot cities – such as Ningbo – since the program started has the potential to worry private investors.

Designing for Sponge Cities 

The Sponge City philosophy is to distribute and retain water at its source, slow down water as it flows away from its source, clean water naturally and be adaptive to water at the sink when water accumulatesthis is in stark contrast to the conventional solution of grey infrastructure, which is to centralize and accumulate water using big reservoirs, speed up the flow by pipes and channelized drains, and fight against water at the end by higher and stronger flood walls and dams.   The theory of Sponge City emphasizes the basic principles of 'based on nature,' 'source control,' 'local adaption,' protecting nature, learning from nature, preserving urban ecological space as much as possible, restoring biodiversity, and creating a beautiful landscape environment. All of this can be realized by achieving natural absorption, natural infiltration, and natural purification. These principles come from long-standing wisdom and strategies practiced across China for thousands of years, when water had to be worked with and around instead of combatted with gray infrastructure. The infiltration effects of the natural ecological background (such as topography and landforms), the purification effect of vegetation and wetlands on water quality, and the combination of natural and artificial means allow the city to absorb and release rainwater. Urban green spaces and urban bodies of water —constructed wetlands, rain gardens, green roofs, recessed green spaces, grass ditches, and ecological parks—are the central "sponge bodies."

There are three main facets to developing such systems: protecting the original urban ecosystem, ecological restoration, and low-impact development.

 Protection focuses on the city's original ecologically sensitive areas, such as rivers, lakes, and ditches. Natural vegetation, soil, and microorganisms are used to gradually treat the aquatic environment and restore the damaged urban ecosystem.
 Restoration measures include identifying ecological patches, constructing ecological corridors, strengthening the connections between the patches, forming a network, and delineating the blue and green lines to restore the aquatic ecological environment.
 Mandatory measures apply to urban roads, urban green spaces, urban water systems, residential areas, and specific buildings to protect ecological patches, maintain their storage capacity, strengthen source control, and form ecological sponges of different scales.
However, sponge city policies have been more frequently implemented in new construction than in retrofitted developments from the past few decades of rapid urbanization. Xiamen's Yangfang residential area and Shanghai's Langang Park are two new developments indicative of this trend.

Pilot Projects 
First Round (2015)

 Baicheng
 Qian’an
 Jinan
 Hebi
 Xixian New Area
 Zhenjiang
 Jiaxing
 Chizhou
 Wuhan
 Changde
 Chongquing
 Suining
 Gui’an New Area
 Nanning
 Pingxiang
 Xiamen

Second-Round (2016)

 Beijing
 Tianjin
 Dalian
 Qingyang
 Guyuan
 Xining
 Shanghai
 Ningbo
 Fuzhou
 Shenzhen
 Zhuhai
 Yuxi
 Sanya

Advantages 

 Improves overall water quality.
 Rainwater is captured and can be reused.
 Reduces chance of flooding.
 Reduces the railway problems.
 Reduces urban heat island intensity.
 Can shorten instances of flash flooding by leading rainwater to a canal.
 Can deal with prolonged periods of rain.

See also
Green infrastructure for stormwater management/Low-impact development (North America)
Nature-based solutions (European Union)
Water-sensitive urban design (Australia)

References 

Hydrology and urban planning
Rainwater harvesting
Irrigation